The Men's Hockey Champions Challenge I was an international men's field hockey tournament, played every two years.

It was introduced in 2001 by the International Hockey Federation (FIH) in order to broaden hockey's competitive base at world level, the last tournament was held in 2014 in Malaysia and won by South Korea. The champions challenge was replaced by the FIH Hockey World League in 2014 after eight editions.

Results

Summaries

Successful national teams

* = host nation

Team appearances

See also
Women's Hockey Champions Challenge I
Men's Hockey Champions Challenge II
Hockey Champions Trophy

References

External links
International Hockey Federation

    
Champions Challenge I
Recurring sporting events established in 2001
Recurring sporting events disestablished in 2014